Mahi (Brahmi script:  Ma-hi) was a Kushan ruler, whose reign is dated to circa 300-305 CE. He probably succeeded Vasudeva II, and his successor was Shaka. Mahi was among the last Kushan Emperors, before they were overrun by the Kidarites.

Mahi, like the last few Kushan rulers, ruled in Gandhara in the area of Taxila, probably under the suzerainty of Gupta Empire rulers, particularly Samudragupta. Their coinage reflected the great Kushan tradition, but the value had been much reduced.

References 

Kushan emperors
3rd-century Indian monarchs